was a town located in Saeki District, Hiroshima Prefecture, Japan.

As of 2003, the town had an estimated population of 26,363 and a density of 372.62 persons per km². The total area is 70.75 km².

On November 3, 2005, Ōno, along with the town of Miyajima (also from Saeki District), was merged into the expanded city of Hatsukaichi.

See also
 Miyajimaguchi

Dissolved municipalities of Hiroshima Prefecture
Hatsukaichi, Hiroshima